The James Norris Memorial Trophy was awarded annually by the International Hockey League to the goaltender(s), with the fewest goals allowed during the regular season. The trophy is named for James E. Norris, former owner of the Detroit Red Wings, in honor of his contributions to the IHL in its early years.

Winners

References
 James Norris Memorial Trophy www.hockeydb.com
 James Norris Memorial Trophy  www.azhockey.com

International Hockey League (1945–2001) trophies